Senator Andrews may refer to:

Members of the Northern Irish Senate
Jack Andrews (1903–1986), Northern Irish Senator from 1964 to 1972

Members of the United States Senate
Charles O. Andrews (1877–1946), U.S. Senator from Florida from 1936 to 1946
Mark Andrews (politician) (born 1926), U.S. Senator from North Dakota from 1981 to 1987

United States state senate members
Abraham D. Andrews (1830–1885), Wisconsin State Senate
Carl Andrews (fl. 1980s–2000s), New York State Senate
Charles B. Andrews (1834–1902), Connecticut State Senate
Christopher Columbus Andrews (1829–1922), Minnesota State Senate
George H. Andrews (1821–1885), New York State Senate
Hunter Andrews (1921–2005), Virginia State Senate
Ike Franklin Andrews (1925–2010), North Carolina State Senate
John Andrews (Colorado politician) (born 1944), Colorado State Senate
Lloyd J. Andrews (1920–2014), Washington State Senate 
Mary Andrews (politician) (fl. 1990s–2010s), Maine State Senate
Thomas Andrews (American politician) (born 1953), Maine State Senate
W. Thomas Andrews (1941–2009), Pennsylvania State Senate
William Henry Andrews (1846–1919), Pennsylvania State Senate
William L. Andrews (1865–1936), Virginia State Senate
William Noble Andrews (1876–1937), Maryland State Senate
John F. Andrew (1850–1895), Massachusetts State Senate